Patricia Kohlmann (born September 17, 1968) is a Mexican former female freestyle and medley swimmer who participated in two consecutive Summer Olympics for her native country, starting in 1984. Her best result was the 11th place in the Women's 4 × 100 m Freestyle Relay at the 1984 Summer Olympics in Los Angeles, California, alongside Teresa Rivera, Rosa Fuentes, and Irma Huerta.

References
Profile

1968 births
Living people
Mexican female medley swimmers
Mexican people of German descent
Mexican female freestyle swimmers
Swimmers at the 1983 Pan American Games
Swimmers at the 1984 Summer Olympics
Swimmers at the 1987 Pan American Games
Swimmers at the 1988 Summer Olympics
Olympic swimmers of Mexico
Pan American Games bronze medalists for Mexico
Pan American Games medalists in swimming
Central American and Caribbean Games gold medalists for Mexico
Central American and Caribbean Games medalists in swimming
Competitors at the 1982 Central American and Caribbean Games
Medalists at the 1983 Pan American Games
21st-century Mexican women
20th-century Mexican women